Calcium peroxide or calcium dioxide is the inorganic compound with the formula CaO2. It is the peroxide (O22−) salt of Ca2+. Commercial samples can be yellowish, but the pure compound is white. It is almost insoluble in water.

Structure and stability
As a solid, it is relatively stable against decomposition. In contact with water however it hydrolyzes with release of oxygen. Upon treatment with an acid, it forms hydrogen peroxide.

Preparation
Calcium peroxide is produced by combining calcium salts and hydrogen peroxide:
Ca(OH)2  +  H2O2   →   CaO2  +  2 H2O
The octahydrate precipitates upon the reaction of calcium hydroxide with dilute hydrogen peroxide. Upon heating it dehydrates.

Applications
It is mainly used as an oxidant to enhance the extraction of precious metals from their ores. In its second main application, it is used as a food additive under the E number E930 it is used as flour bleaching agent and improving agent.

In agriculture it is used in the presowing treatments of rice seed. Also, calcium peroxide has found use in aquaculture to oxygenate and disinfect water. In the ecological restoration industry it is used in the treatment of soils. Calcium peroxide is used in a similar manner to magnesium peroxide for environmental restoration programs. It is used to restore soil and groundwater contaminated with petroleum by the process of enhanced in-situ bioremediation. It is a minor component of some dentifrices. 

It is also used for curing polythioether polymers by oxidising terminal thiol groups to disulphide bridges.

References

Peroxides
Calcium compounds
Food additives
Bleaches
Disinfectants
Oxidizing agents